The Jeanne Córdova Prize for Lesbian/Queer Nonfiction, established in 2018, is an annual literary award presented by the Lambda Literary Foundation to honor Jeanne Córdova. The award is granted to "lesbian/queer-identified women and trans/gender non-conforming nonfiction authors ... committed to nonfiction work that captures the depth and complexity of lesbian/queer life, culture, and/or history." Winners must have "published at least one book and show promise in continuing to produce groundbreaking and challenging work." Winners receive a $2,500 cash prize.

Recipients

References 

Lambda Literary Awards
Awards established in 2018
English-language literary awards
Lists of LGBT-related award winners and nominees